Sharklet may refer to:

Blended winglets on aircraft, specifically those manufactured by Airbus
Sharklet (material), a plastic sheet product